Madhosh is a 1994 Indian film directed by Vikram Bhatt and produced by Tahir Hussain. The film is Tahir Hussain's son Faisal Khan's debut as a leading actor, having previously played bit parts in his brother Aamir Khan's films Qayamat Se Qayamat Tak and Jo Jeeta Wohi Sikandar. The film also stars Anjali Jathar in her film debut, Kiran Kumar, Dilip Dhawan and Supriya Pathak.

Cast
Dilip Dhawan
Anjali Jathar
Faisal Khan
Kiran Kumar
Supriya Pathak
Parikshit Sahni

Soundtrack
Anand–Milind scored the music while Sameer authored the lyrics. The music wasn't successful, but is considered one of the best musical scores from the duo.

References

External links
Madhosh at the Internet Movie Database

1994 films
Films directed by Vikram Bhatt
Films scored by Anand–Milind
1990s Hindi-language films